Sergi García can refer to:

Sergi García (basketball) (born 1997), Spanish basketball player
Sergi García (footballer) (born 1999), Spanish footballer

See also
Sergio García (disambiguation)